{{Taxobox
| name = Finella rufocincta
| image = Finella rufocincta 01.jpg
| image_caption =
| regnum = Animalia
| phylum = Mollusca
| classis = Gastropoda
| unranked_superfamilia= clade Caenogastropodaclade Sorbeoconcha
| superfamilia = Cerithioidea
| familia = Scaliolidae
| subfamilia =
| genus = Finella
| subgenus =
| species = F. rufocincta'
| binomial = Finella rufocincta| binomial_authority = (A. Adams, 1861) 
| synonyms_ref = 
| synonyms =
 Alaba fulva Watson, 1886
 Dunkeria rufocincta A. Adams, 1861 (basionym)
 Eufenella subpellucida Kuroda & Habe, 1961
 Finella fulva (Watson, 1886)
 Obtortio fulva (Watson, 1886)
}}Finella rufocincta is a species of sea snail, a marine gastropod mollusk in the family Scaliolidae.

Description

Distribution
This marine species occurs off Madagascar.

References

 Dautzenberg, Ph. (1929). Contribution à l'étude de la faune de Madagascar: Mollusca marina testacea. Faune des colonies françaises, III (fasc. 4). Société d'Editions géographiques, maritimes et coloniales: Paris. 321–636, plates IV-VII pp.
 Laseron C.F. (1956) The families Rissoinidae and Rissoidae (Mollusca) from the Solanderian and Dampierian zoogeographical provinces. Australian Journal of Marine and Freshwater Research 7(3): 384–484. [October 1956] page(s): 461
 Hasegawa K. (1998) A review of Recent Japanese species previously assigned to Eufenella and Clathrofenella (Mollusca: Gastropoda: Cerithioidea)''. Memoiurs of the National Science Museum, Tokyo 31: 165–186.

Scaliolidae